John Patsalos (born January 6, 1938) is an American former neo-Nazi who was convicted of the August 25, 1967 murder of American Nazi Party leader George Lincoln Rockwell.

Early life
Patsalos was born in New York City to Greek parents. When John was five, his mother took him and his younger brother, George (born 1939), and moved to his grandmother's house. Shortly after, his father shot and killed his mother. John's father was convicted of manslaughter and sent to Sing Sing Prison. He was released on parole in 1953. After John's grandmother died, he and his brother were sent to the Bronx to live with their father. Both brothers spent two weeks at the Youth House while their father faced child abuse charges, but were released back into his custody.

Career 
Patsalos served in the U.S. Marine Corps from 1958 to 1960, when he was honorably discharged on grounds of "unsuitability" after being arrested at an American Nazi Party rally. He joined the American Nazi Party in 1960 and changed his surname to "Patler" to make it sound more like "Hitler".

Patler became a captain in the American Nazi Party and the editor and cartoonist for the party's magazine, Stormtrooper. Patler drew racist and anti-desegregationist cartoons. However, he was expelled from the Party in March 1967 for "Bolshevik leanings" after disagreeing with party leader George Lincoln Rockwell about some of the party's policies.

Patler described his relationship with Rockwell in endearing terms, stating "I loved him like a father and he loved me like a son". In his last letter to Rockwell, Patler wrote: "I don't think there are two people on earth who think and feel the same as we do. ... You are a very important part of my life. I need you as much as you need me. Without you there is no future".

Shooting and sentencing 
On August 25, 1967, Patler shot and killed Rockwell while Rockwell was in his car, parked in front of a laundromat at an Arlington, Virginia, shopping center. Rockwell was shot with a 7.63 mm broomhandle Mauser pistol. Patler was arrested half an hour later, about a mile (1.5 km) from the scene of the shooting. He was convicted of first degree murder on December 16, 1967. The prosecutor requested a death sentence due to the highly premeditated nature of the slaying, but the jury recommended the most lenient sentence possible, 20 years. Patler was sentenced to 20 years in prison by Arlington Circuit Court Judge Charles Russell.

Patler remained in the county jail while appealing his murder conviction. In 1969, he won a $15,000 libel ruling against a Nazi official who had told the FBI that Patler had stolen the gun used to kill Rockwell. After losing his appeal to the Supreme Court of Virginia for murdering Rockwell, he was sent to prison in 1970. In June 1972, the Supreme Court of the United States unanimously turned down an appeal.

Patler was paroled in August 1975, having served less than eight years of his sentence. In 1976, he was charged with trespassing and possession of marijuana; his trespassing charge was later dismissed. After violating his parole, he received an additional six-year sentence.

Legacy 
In 1970, Patsalos was reported as using his old name again, and as contributing to a Spanish language newspaper called El Pueblo, with him condemning racism in an editorial. He also described his former racism as being due to "an inferiority complex. I hated myself for being dark and Greek." In a 1970 article, Patsalos said, "I think [members of the National Socialist White People's Party are] always watching me ... so I never go any place without looking behind me", along with claiming "I think one of them may be the guy who really killed Rockwell".

In the early 1970s, Patsalos attended art classes at Radford College under a study-release program, although in 1975 a temporary ban was imposed on enrollment of prisoners and parolees, after college officials learned who he was, along with claiming they didn't have knowledge of the program. The ACLU disputed the ban, although did not dispute the college's subsequent refusal to give Patsalos a dorm.

In 1978, media outlets reported that Patsalos was attempting to get a name change back to his original name.

In a 2012 book, Nicholas, the son of Patsalos, recalled his father expressing regret for his time in the ANP, with him saying "I should have been with Dr. King and the Civil Rights people back then. They were truly my people, not those Nazis." In 2017, The Washington Post described Patsalos as a "staunch online defender of Donald Trump". He refused multiple interview requests from the newspaper.

References

1938 births
Living people
American Nazi Party members
American people convicted of murder
American people of Greek descent
People convicted of murder by Virginia
Criminals from New York City
Military personnel from New York City
United States Marines
American assassins
American cartoonists